Idavada, a portmanteau of Idaho & Nevada, is an historical locale in Twin Falls County, Idaho. It is home to the Idavada Volcanics formation of silicic rocks. The nearest major highway is U.S. Route 93, and the nearest established settlement is Jackpot, Nevada.

References 
Reference on "USA Historical Sites"
Article on Futility Closet
Article on the Snake River Plain

Geography of Twin Falls County, Idaho